Pavlos Kountouriotis (9 April 1855 – 22 August 1935) was a Greek rear admiral  during the Balkan Wars, regent, and the first President of the Second Hellenic Republic. In total he served four times as head of the Greek State, the most times in the history of the seat.

Early life
Pavlos Kountouriotis was born on the island of Hydra to Theodoros Kountouriotis, Consul and Member of the Greek Parliament and Loukia Negreponte.  From his father's side he descended from the Kountouriotis, an Arvanite Hydriot family originally from the village of Kountoura, in the Megarid. Pavlos used Arvanitika frequently as well, and his personal secretary wrote about him that whenever he traveled to Hydra he preferred to use only Arvanitika. He was the grandson of Georgios, a shipowner who like many members of his family, participated in the Greek War of Independence and served as Prime Minister of Greece under King Otto. From his mother's side he was descended from the Negreponte family, a prominent family from Chios and was great-grandson of Constantine Hangerli, Prince of Wallachia. He was the second of nine children, including Ioannis Kountouriotis. Little is known of Pavlos' childhood. In 1875, following his family's long-standing naval tradition, he joined the Royal Hellenic Navy, presumably in the rank of Ensign.

Naval service

First achievements
In 1886, he took part in the naval operations at Preveza as a lieutenant. During the Greco-Turkish War of 1897, serving as lieutenant commander he commanded the ship Alfeios. His ship took part in at least two landings of Greek troops on the island of Crete in support of the Cretan Revolt. In 1901, commanding the training ship Miaoulis, he was sent to Boston. This was reported as the first transatlantic trip of a Greek war vessel. Kountouriotis served as an aide-de-camp to King Geórgios I from 1908 until 1911, receiving the rank of Captain in 1909.
In June 1911, Kountouriotis was sent to Britain, to take control of the newly-commissioned , following the "blue cheese mutiny". As he was highly esteemed, he quickly reimposed discipline and set sail for Greece.

Balkan Wars
On 16 April 1912 he was appointed Chief of the Navy General Staff until 16 September, when he was appointed of the Aegean Fleet, in view of the worsening situation in the Balkans, and the imminent outbreak of the First Balkan War.

Kountouriotis played a crucial role in the Greek government's decision to enter the war. Partly because the Greek fleet had not yet completed its modernization programme, and in view of the disaster of 1897, the Greek leadership remained ambivalent about Greece's prospects. Kountouriotis weighed in decisively in these discussions, proclaiming his confidence that even with the existing fleet, victory could be achieved, thanks to superior personnel. His reply to Prime Minister Eleftherios Venizelos became famous:

During the Balkan Wars, with his flagship, Georgios Averof, he led the Greek Navy to major victories against the Turkish fleet in December 1912 (Battle of Elli) and in January 1913 (Battle of Limnos), bringing most of the Aegean islands under Greek control. His victories, due in large part to his daring but successful tactics, earned him the status of a national hero. He was promoted to vice admiral for "exceptional war service", the first Greek career officer since Konstantinos Kanaris to reach the rank (usually reserved for members of the Greek royal family).

Politics
In 1916, he became a minister in the Stephanos Skouloudis government, but, in disagreement with the pro-German feelings of King Konstantínos I of the Hellenes, he followed Eleftherios Venizelos to Thessaloniki where he was assigned the ministry of Naval Affairs in Venizelos' National Defence government. Konstantínos was deposed, and replaced on the throne by his second-eldest son, The Prince Aléxandros. Kountouriotis subsequently retired from the navy with the honorary rank of full Admiral. On the death of the young King Aléxandros of the Hellenes in 1920, he was elected Regent of Greece by the Greek Parliament on 28 October by a vote of 137 to 3. After the sitting government of Venizelos was defeated in the elections that took place in November 1920, Kountouriotis resigned as Regent on 17 November, to be replaced by Queen Olga, King Aléxandros's grandmother. The following month, King Konstantínos was restored.

President
After King George II of Greece was deposed, he served as the first president (provisional) of the Second Hellenic Republic, from September 1925 until his resignation in March 1926; in opposition to General Pangalos' dictatorship. He served a second time as a provisional president from August 1926 until December 1929.

Death and honors
Admiral Pávlos Kountouriotis died in 1935. Α World War II Greek destroyer and a Standard-class frigate, Kountouriotis, are named after him.One of the two gold 100-Euro coins issued by Greece in 2012 to commemorate the centenary of the Balkan Wars featured Kountouriotis and Georgios Averof.

See also
 History of the Hellenic Navy

References

1855 births
1935 deaths
20th-century presidents of Greece
20th-century regents of Greece
Republicanism in Greece
Arvanites
Hellenic Navy admirals
Greek people of World War I
Admirals of World War I
Greek military personnel of the Balkan Wars
People from Hydra (island)
Presidents of Greece
Regents of Greece
Commander's Crosses of the Cross of Valour (Greece)
Chiefs of the Hellenic Navy General Staff